Nadi Shabab Alsamu Al-Riyadhi or simply Shabab Alsamu (شباب السموع) is a Palestinian professional football club based in Hebron, that plays in the West Bank Premier League.
The club was founded in 1976.

External links

Shabab Alsamu on Facebook

Shabab Alsamu on Twitter

Football clubs in the West Bank